By-elections for the Croatian Military Frontier districts that had been incorporated into the Kingdom of Croatia-Slavonia in 1881 were held over three days between 19 and 21 April 1883.

Results

Elected representatives

References

Elections in Croatia
Croatia
1883 in Croatia
Elections in Austria-Hungary
April 1883 events
Kingdom of Croatia-Slavonia
Election and referendum articles with incomplete results